David Arthur Kinsella (born 23 February 1937) is a former New Zealand cricket umpire. He stood in three Test matches between 1981 and 1983 and six ODI games between 1982 and 1985. He also played for Central Districts in the Plunket Shield and Taranaki in the Hawke Cup. He is the father of Penny Kinsella.

See also
 List of Test cricket umpires
 List of One Day International cricket umpires

References

1937 births
Living people
Cricketers from New Plymouth
New Zealand cricketers
Central Districts cricketers
New Zealand Test cricket umpires
New Zealand One Day International cricket umpires